Roger Maurice Bourbonnais (born October 26, 1942) is a retired ice hockey player.

Career
Bourbonnais played junior hockey for the Edmonton Oil Kings from 1960 to 1963. In his final year with the Oil Kings, he served as the team captain and led them to their first-ever Memorial Cup Championships.

After playing junior hockey, he was recruited by Father David Bauer to attend the University of British Columbia. While there, Bauer coached them to compete in the Winter Olympics as part of the Canadian National Team.

Bourbonnais competed in the 1964 and 1968 Winter Olympics and skated for Canada at the 1965, 1966 and 1967 IIHF World Championships. He won two bronze medals with the team under coach Bauer. His success on the international level drew attention from the Detroit Red Wings of the National Hockey League, however, he turned them down to pursue his law degree.

Bourbonnais was inducted into the International Ice Hockey Federation Hall of Fame in 1999 and the Alberta Hockey Hall of Fame in 2011.

Personal life

His granddaughter Jaime Bourbonnais also plays ice hockey for Team Canada.

References

External links
 
IIHF Hockey Hall of Fame bio
2011 Alberta Hockey Hall of Fame bio
Legends of Hockey.net
Top 20 Players To Never Play in NHL

1942 births
Living people
Canadian ice hockey centres
Edmonton Flyers (WHL) players
Edmonton Oil Kings (WCHL) players
Franco-Albertan people
Ice hockey players at the 1964 Winter Olympics
Ice hockey players at the 1968 Winter Olympics
IIHF Hall of Fame inductees
Olympic ice hockey players of Canada
Olympic medalists in ice hockey
Olympic bronze medalists for Canada
Ice hockey people from Edmonton